KWLA (103.1 FM, KWLA 103.1) is an American radio station licensed to Anacoco, Louisiana and broadcasting to Leesville, Louisiana with a News/Talk format.

On air
Weekday Schedule
 Hugh Hewitt - 5AM-7AM
 Tedd Dumas - 7AM-9AM
 Moon Griffon - 9AM-11AM
 Rush Limbaugh - 11AM-2PM
 Sean Hannity - 2PM-5PM
 Joe Pags - 5PM-8PM
 Tedd Dumas - 8PM-9 PM
 Ground Zero with Clyde Lewis - 9PM-12AM
 Coast to Coast AM - 12AM-5AM

External links
KWLA's official website

Radio stations in Louisiana
Radio stations established in 2014
Vernon Parish, Louisiana
News and talk radio stations in the United States
2014 establishments in Louisiana